

This is a list of the Indiana state historical markers in Jefferson County.

This is intended to be a complete list of the official state historical markers placed in Jefferson County, Indiana, United States by the Indiana Historical Bureau. The locations of the historical markers and their latitude and longitude coordinates are included below when available, along with their names, years of placement, and topics as recorded by the Historical Bureau.  There are 13 historical markers located in Jefferson County.

Historical markers

See also
List of Indiana state historical markers
National Register of Historic Places listings in Jefferson County, Indiana

References

External links
Indiana Historical Marker Program
Indiana Historical Bureau

Jefferson County
Historical markers